Barrio Obrero may refer to:

Barrio Obrero (Asunción), Paraguay
Barrio Obrero (Santurce), Puerto Rico
Barrio Obrero, a place in Altos de Arroyo Hondo, Dominican Republic